Dead time is the time after an event during which detection systems are not able to record another event.

Dead Time or Dead time may also refer to: 
 Dead Time (Doctor Who audio), a Doctor Who audio production based on the television series
 Dead Time: Kala, a 2007 Indonesian film
 Dead Time, the pilot episode of an A&E television series named Paranormal State
 Dead time (imprisonment), time spent institutionalized that does not count as credit toward the defendant's sentence.
 Dead Time (Creaming Jesus), a 1991 EP by the band Creaming Jesus

See also
Deadtime Stories (disambiguation)